Orthocormus is an extinct genus of prehistoric pachycormiform bony fish. It is known from three species found in Late Jurassic (Kimmeridgian) aged plattenkalk deposits in Bavaria, Germany. The species "Hypsocormus" tenuirostris Woodward 1889 from the late Middle Jurassic (Callovian) Oxford Clay is not closely related to the type species of Hypsocormus, and is more closely related to Orthocormus + Protosphyraena, and thus has sometimes been referred to in open nomenclature as Orthocormus? tenuirostris.

See also

 Prehistoric fish
 List of prehistoric bony fish

References

External links
 

Pachycormiformes